The Stanley Industrial Alliance Stage (formerly the Stanley Theatre) is a landmark theatre at 12th Avenue and Granville Street in Vancouver, British Columbia which serves as the main stage for the Arts Club Theatre Company. The Stanley first opened as a movie theatre in December 1930, and showed movies for over sixty years before falling revenues led to its closure in 1991. After years of threatened commercial redevelopment, the Stanley was renovated as a stage theatre in 1997–1998 and subsequently awarded status as a heritage building.

As a stage for the Arts Club, the Stanley has been used to put on classics, Broadway musicals and other large productions, including Swing!,  My Fair Lady, Miss Saigon, Disney's Beauty and the Beast and Irving Berlin's White Christmas. The theatre, which went through major fundraising to finance its renovations and mortgage, at one stage lost its sponsor du Maurier due to tobacco regulations, but in 2005 received new sponsorship from Industrial Alliance Pacific Life Insurance Company and the theatre's name was changed to the Stanley Industrial Alliance Stage.

Movie theatre
The Stanley opened on December 15, 1930. Originally envisioned as a vaudeville venue, it was built by Frederick Guest, owner of a chain of theatres in Ontario, who reportedly fell in love with Vancouver and decided to build his dream theatre there. He hired Henry Holdsby Simmonds as the architect, who designed it with a neoclassical interior and an Art Deco exterior, with seating for 1,216 people. In order to make as high quality a theatre as possible, Simmonds used only the best materials he could find, including tindle stone from Winnipeg and tiles from Italy, along with chandeliers, carpets and furnishings from local merchants. Like the Stanley Cup and Stanley Park, the theatre was named after Governor General of Canada Lord Stanley.

The first film shown at the Stanley was One Romantic Night, starring Lillian Gish. Admission was originally between 10 and 40 cents. The vertical Stanley sign was added in 1940 and the stylized Stanley script came in 1957. The cinema, which had been part of the Granville Theatre Company, was bought by Famous Players in 1941 for $268,000.

The Stanley was originally built as a neighbourhood theatre, but gradually became more popular and attracted moviegoers from throughout the Vancouver region. From the 1950s onwards, progressively improved sound and projection systems along with refurbished seating added to the theatre's appeal. On July 8, 1954 the Stanley began showing films in stereophonic CinemaScope for the first time. By December 1958, the theatre had a DP70 70mm projector, and the Stanley was advertised as "the only Todd-AO theatre in Western Canada". By October 1978, the auditorium was equipped with Dolby Stereo, and by December 1985 its sound system was upgraded and certified to THX quality assurance standards.

The Stanley often showed blockbusters. Some movies shown at the theatre through the years included The Exorcist, The Towering Inferno, The Muppet Movie, Apocalypse Now, The Empire Strikes Back, The Elephant Man, Poltergeist, The Right Stuff, Indiana Jones and the Temple of Doom, Top Gun, Empire of the Sun, Indiana Jones and the Last Crusade, and Goodfellas.

Revenues declined during the late 20th century, and Famous Players closed the Stanley, which was by then the oldest operating movie theatre in Vancouver, on September 25, 1991 after a final showing of the Stanley regular Fantasia; the theatre had previously shown Fantasia at least four times, in 1977, 1979, 1980–1981, and 1990. Its closure was part of a long trend: The number of Famous Players theatres had dropped from 419 in 1954 to 196 in 1969, and would fall to eighty, some in partnership with other companies, by the time it was taken over by Cineplex Galaxy Entertainment in 2005. Other Vancouver-area Famous Players movie theatres closed, sold or torn down in this period included the Fine Arts (1989), Denman Place (1989), Park Royal (1993), the Park (2005), and the Capitol 6 (2005).

Renovation
Famous Players put the Stanley up for sale in the spring of 1991, with the condition that it not be used as a movie theatre. In the months leading up to the Stanley's closure, Famous Players had a conditional sale agreement for the theatre with Vancouver developer Sandy Cox, who was planning to keep the Stanley's facade and convert the interior into retail space. The Vancouver City Council received a proposal to change the building to retail use, which it approved, but the planned development was abandoned, and the building remained vacant for several years. During the early 1990s, a "Save Our Stanley" campaign was begun to preserve the building and prevent commercial redevelopment of the space. In 1994, the Stanley Theatre Society was formed to try to buy the Stanley for the Arts Club Theatre Company, and in 1997 it purchased the theatre from Famous Players for $3,173,000. Renovation costs, including sound and lighting equipment, came to $5.8 million, which brought the costs of purchase and renovation to about $9 million, $1.5 million more than the $7.5 million originally budgeted. Money came from fundraising campaigns by the Arts Club and Vancouver TheatreSports, at least $3.9 million from the provincial and federal government, a $100,000 grant from the City of Vancouver, the purchase of a density transfer to the One Wall Centre by Peter Wall for $1.2 million, as well as corporate sponsorship by du Maurier, although du Maurier would later withdraw as a sponsor because of federal restrictions on tobacco advertising.

Architects including Thom Weeks and Jennifer Stanley led renovations of the Stanley into a live theatre. Weeks was initially disappointed with the state of the pre-renovated theatre, which looked "pretty tired" with its aged orange walls and sticky, soft drink-stained carpets. However, by the time the renovations were completed, and the actors and musicians were getting ready to first perform in it, there was a general feeling of excitement about the theatre. Renovations included expansion of the lobby, reconfiguration of the balcony, an expansion of the stage to twice its original size, a new twenty-five metre fly tower from which to raise and lower scenery, new dressing rooms, a trap room, an electrical room and a green room backstage, a reduction of the number of seats from 1,216 to 650, a crush bar in the old projection booth, a section cut out of the theatre's dome to use for spotlights, and a full restoration of the theatre's gold-leafed plaster decorations. As a result of these renovations, in 1999 the theatre was awarded a City of Vancouver Heritage Award, as well as an IES International Illumination Design Award.

Effects on the local area
A 2003 study claimed the Stanley's renovation brought positive economic effects to the theatre's local area, bounded by 8th Street and 17th between Fir and Hemlock. According to the study, this area became more of a leisure/recreation destination, with many new culturally related businesses, retail stores and service-related businesses opening. An increase in overall sales was noted and 76% of surveyed residents responded that the theatre's reopening had a positive effect on the community. Business respondents also reportedly had a positive view of the theatre's effects.

Live stage

After renovation, owing to du Maurier's sponsorship, the facility was named the Stanley Theatre du Maurier Stage, taken over by the Arts Club Theatre Company and later became their main stage. This venue has allowed the Arts Club to put on new kinds of shows, such as large musicals, classics and productions from around the world. The first production was Swing!, which opened on October 28, 1998 and had a successful run, followed by Hamlet. In addition to showing Arts Club productions, the theatre is rented out for other purposes, including business and educational presentations, and has been used for comedy acts and concerts, such as Lorne Elliott, Francis Cabrel, and RyanDan.

By 2005 du Maurier had withdrawn as a sponsor and, along with its over-budget renovation costs, the Stanley was left with a $2 million mortgage. That year Industrial Alliance Pacific Life Insurance Company made a $1.5 million donation, and on April 5 the theatre was renamed the Stanley Industrial Alliance Stage for the next twenty years.

Productions

See also

 List of heritage buildings in Vancouver
 Theatre in Canada
 South Granville Rise
 Orpheum (Vancouver)

Notes

References

 
 
 
 
 
 
 
 
  
 
 
 
 
 
 
 
 
 
 
 
 
 
 
 
 
 
 
 
 
 
 
 </ref>

External links
 The Arts Club

Art Deco architecture in Canada
Cinemas and movie theatres in Vancouver
Movie palaces
Theatres in Vancouver
Former cinemas in Canada
Heritage buildings in Vancouver